The 1923 USSR Chess Championship was the second edition of USSR Chess Championship. Held from 8 to 24 July in Petrograd. The tournament was won by Peter Romanovsky.

Table and results

References 

USSR Chess Championships
Chess
Chess
1923 in chess
1923 in the Soviet Union